Stanley Howard (1 July 1934 – 2004) was a footballer who played as a midfielder during the 1950s and 1960s. He was born in Chorley, Lancashire.

1934 births
2004 deaths
Sportspeople from Chorley
English footballers
Association football midfielders
Huddersfield Town A.F.C. players
Bradford City A.F.C. players
Barrow A.F.C. players
Halifax Town A.F.C. players
English Football League players